Major-General John Charles Campbell,  (10 January 1894 – 26 February 1942), known as Jock Campbell, was a British Army officer and recipient of the Victoria Cross, the highest award for gallantry in the face of the enemy that can be awarded to British and Commonwealth forces.

Early life and career
Campbell was born in Thurso and educated at Sedbergh School. At the beginning of the First World War in August 1914 he joined the Honourable Artillery Company, and, after graduating from the Royal Military Academy, Woolwich, was commissioned into the Royal Horse Artillery in 1915. Serving in France, he was wounded twice and ended the war as a captain, having earned the Military Cross (MC). Between the wars he became a first class horseman (in the top flight at both polo and hunting), while continuing to serve as an artillery officer.

Second World War

When the Second World War broke out Campbell was 45 years old and a major commanding a battery in the 4th Regiment Royal Horse Artillery in Egypt. When Italy declared war in June 1940, Campbell, by then a lieutenant colonel, was commanding the artillery component of 7th Armoured Division's Support Group under Brigadier William Gott. The British Army was heavily outnumbered by the Italians, so General Archibald Wavell formulated a plan with his senior commanders to retain the initiative by harassing the enemy using mobile all-arms flying columns. Campbell's brilliant command of one of these columns led to their being given the generic name "Jock columns" (although it is unclear if the idea originated with Campbell or not).

During Operation Compass Campbell's guns played an important role in 7th Support Group's involvement in the decisive battle at Beda Fomm in February 1941 which led to the surrender of the Italian Tenth Army. In April 1941 Campbell was awarded the Distinguished Service Order (DSO), receiving a second award clasp shortly afterwards.

In September 1941 Gott was promoted to command 7th Armoured Division and Campbell took over command 7th Support Group as an acting brigadier. In November 1941 during Operation Crusader, 7th Support Group was occupying the airfield at Sidi Rezegh, south of Tobruk, together with 7th Armoured Brigade. On 21 November 1941 they were attacked by the two armoured divisions of the Afrika Korps. The British tanks suffered heavy losses but prevented the Germans taking the airfield. Brigadier Campbell's small force, holding important ground, was repeatedly attacked and wherever the fighting was hardest he was to be seen either on foot, in his open car or astride a tank. According to Alan Moorehead,

The following day he was again at the forefront, encouraging his troops through continued enemy attacks. He personally directed the fire of his batteries, and twice manned a gun himself to replace casualties. Though wounded, he refused to be evacuated during the final German attack. His leadership did much to maintain the fighting spirit of his men, and resulted in heavy casualties being inflicted upon the enemy. The fighting continued on 23 November, but with 7th Armoured Brigade destroyed and the 5th South African Infantry Brigade being decimated, Campbell withdrew the remains of his support group to the south. For his actions during the battle, Campbell was awarded the Victoria Cross.

He purportedly received a letter of congratulation from General Johann von Ravenstein, commander of the 21st Panzer Division, one of the armoured formations which Campbell had faced at Sidi Rezegh. When interviewed later as a prisoner of war, Ravenstein freely expressed his "greatest admiration" for Campbell's skill on "those hot days" and recalled "all the many iron that flew near the aerodrome around our ears".

In February 1942 Campbell was promoted Major-General and given command of 7th Armoured Division, while Gott was promoted from the 7th to lead XIII Corps.

Three weeks after his promotion Campbell was killed when his jeep overturned on a newly laid clay road. The driver of the jeep, Major Roy Farran, and the other passengers were thrown clear from the wreck and knocked unconscious. Farran had been Campbell's Aide-de-Camp, and later admitted considering suicide while waiting for medical help. During the Western Desert campaign Campbell was considered one of the finest commanders in the Eighth Army, an old desert hand who had been in North Africa from the start of the war. His loss was deeply felt.

Victoria Cross
His Victoria Cross is displayed at the Royal Artillery Museum, Woolwich, England. The citation for the award was published in the London Gazette on 30 January 1942, reading:

Further information
A memorial to Campbell stands in his old school, Sedbergh, commemorating his brave deeds.

There is a plaque and bench on a seaside walk in his home town in his honour. Major-General Campbell is also recorded on the War memorial in the village of Flore, 7 miles West of Northampton.

References

Bibliography

External links

Generals of World War II

1894 births
1942 deaths
Burials in Egypt
Graduates of the Royal Military Academy, Woolwich
British Army major generals
Scottish military personnel
British World War II recipients of the Victoria Cross
Recipients of the Military Cross
British Army personnel of World War I
British Army generals of World War II
British Army personnel killed in World War II
People educated at Sedbergh School
John Charles
Royal Horse Artillery officers
People from Thurso
Companions of the Distinguished Service Order
British Army recipients of the Victoria Cross
Royal Artillery officers